Pavonis is the Latin genitive of Latin pavo = "peacock". It may refer to:-
Pavonis Mons, a large mountain of Mars
Pavo (constellation)
Delta Pavonis, a nearby star